Group D of UEFA Euro 2020 took place from 13 to 22 June 2021 in Glasgow's Hampden Park and London's Wembley Stadium. The group contained host nation England, Croatia, host nation Scotland and the Czech Republic. The head-to-head match between the hosts took place at England's Wembley Stadium.

Teams

Notes

Standings

In the round of 16,
The winner of Group D, England, advanced to play the runner-up of Group F, Germany.
The runner-up of Group D, Croatia, advanced to play the runner-up of Group E, Spain.
The third-placed team of Group D, the Czech Republic, advanced as one of the four best third-placed teams to play the winner of Group C, the Netherlands.

Matches

England vs Croatia
England's win and Croatia's loss were their respective firsts in their opening match of a European Championship. England substitute Jude Bellingham became the youngest English player at 17 years and 349 days to play in a European Championship finals match when he came on to replace Harry Kane in the 82nd minute.

Scotland vs Czech Republic

Croatia vs Czech Republic

England vs Scotland

Croatia vs Scotland

Czech Republic vs England

Discipline
Fair play points were to be used as a tiebreaker if the head-to-head and overall records of teams were tied (and if a penalty shoot-out was not applicable as a tiebreaker). These were calculated based on yellow and red cards received in all group matches as follows:
yellow card = 1 point
red card as a result of two yellow cards = 3 points
direct red card = 3 points
yellow card followed by direct red card = 4 points

Only one of the above deductions was applied to a player in a single match.

References

External links

Group D overview at UEFA.com

UEFA Euro 2020
England at UEFA Euro 2020
Croatia at UEFA Euro 2020
Scotland at UEFA Euro 2020
Czech Republic at UEFA Euro 2020
England–Scotland football rivalry